La Libertad is a city located in western Santa Elena, Ecuador, by the sea. It is the seat of La Libertad Canton.

As of the census of 2001, there are 77,646 people residing in the city. La Libertad is a canton itself, since 1993. Before 1993, it was part of Salinas Canton. La Libertad has important oil fields and reservoirs.

External links
Official Site

Populated places in Santa Elena Province
Populated coastal places in Ecuador